The 2000 Tampa Bay Devil Rays season was their third since the franchise was created. They finished last in the AL East division with a record of 69–92. Their manager was Larry Rothschild, who entered his third year with the club. This season is sometimes referred to as the "Hit Show" because the club signed several big-name sluggers in hopes of the team putting up better offensive numbers.

Offseason
December 13, 1999: Scott McClain was released by the Tampa Bay Devil Rays.
March 31, 2000: Billy Taylor was signed as a free agent with the Tampa Bay Devil Rays.

Regular season
On September 28, 2000, the Yankees played the Devil Rays at Tampa Bay. In the top of the 2nd inning, Jose Canseco was walked. Tino Martinez then hit a double to center field. The ball was fielded by Gerald Williams and relayed to Mike DiFelice. He tagged Jose Canseco at the plate and proceeded to tag out Tino Martinez who was running right behind Canseco. Mike DiFelice tagged both runners out at the plate.

Opening Day starters

Season standings

Record vs. opponents

Notable transactions
 April 13, 2000: Dwight Gooden was purchased by the Tampa Bay Devil Rays from the Houston Astros.
 May 25, 2000: Dwight Gooden was released by the Tampa Bay Devil Rays.
 June 5, 2000: Rocco Baldelli was drafted by the Tampa Bay Devil Rays in the 1st round (6th pick) of the 2000 amateur draft. Player signed June 19, 2000.

Citrus Series
The 2000 Citrus Series between the Devil Rays and the Florida Marlins ended in a 3–3 tie.  Florida had won the series during the prior two seasons.

June 9 - Devil Rays vs Marlins: 6 – 4
June 10 - Devil Rays vs Marlins: 1 – 5
June 11 - Devil Rays vs Marlins: 7 – 6
July 7 - Devil Rays @ Marlins: 8 – 3
July 8 - Devil Rays @ Marlins: 5 – 6
July 9 - Devil Rays @ Marlins: 9 – 10

Roster

Player stats

Batting

Starters by position
Note: Pos = Position; G = Games played; AB = At bats; H = Hits; HR = Home runs; RBI = Runs batted in; Avg. = Batting average; SB = Stolen bases

Other batters
Note: G = Games played; AB = At bats; H = Hits; HR = Home runs; RBI = Runs batted in; Avg. = Batting average; SB = Stolen bases

Pitching

Starting pitchers 
Note: G = Games pitched; IP = Innings pitched; W = Wins; L = Losses; ERA = Earned run average; SO = Strikeouts

Other pitchers 
Note: G = Games pitched; IP = Innings pitched; W = Wins; L = Losses; ERA = Earned run average; SO = Strikeouts; SV = Saves

Relief pitchers 
Note: G = Games pitched; IP = Innings pitched; W = Wins; L = Losses; ERA = Earned run average; SO = Strikeouts; SV = Saves

Game log

|- style="text-align:center; background: #bfb"
|1
|April 3
|@ Twins
|7 – 0
|Trachsel (1–0)
|Radke (0–1)
|
|43,830
|1-0
|- style="text-align:center; background: #fbb"
|2
|April 4
|@ Twins
|6 – 5
|Carrasco (1–0)
|Hernandez (0–1)
|
|7,020
|1-1
|- style="text-align:center; background: #fbb"
|3
|April 5
|@ Twins
|10 –7
|Guardado (1–0)
|White (0–1)
|
|7,089
|1-2
|- style="text-align:center; background: #bfb"
|4
|April 6
|@ Twins
|7 – 6
|Mecir (1–0)
|Carrasco (1–1)
|Hernandez (1)
|8,763
|2-2
|- style="text-align:center; background: #fbb"
|5
|April 7
|Indians
|14 – 5
|Wright (1–0)
|Guzmán (0–1)
|
|40,329
|2-3
|- style="text-align:center; background: #fbb"
|6
|April 8
|Indians
|6 – 4
|Burba (1–0)
|Trachsel (1–1)
|Karsay (2)
|30,177
|2-4
|- style="text-align:center; background: #fbb"
|7
|April 9
|Indians
|17 – 4
|Colón (2–0)
|Rupe (0–1)
|
|21,357
|2-5
|- style="text-align:center; background: #fbb"
|8
|April 11
|White Sox
|13 – 6
|Parque (1–0)
|Yan (0–1)
|
|13,639
|2-6
|- style="text-align:center; background: #fbb"
|9
|April 12
|White Sox
|7 – 1
|Baldwin (2–0)
|Wheeler (0–1)
|
|14,034
|2-7
|- style="text-align:center; background: #bfb"
|10
|April 13
|White Sox
|6 – 5 (12)
|Mecir (2–0)
|Sturtze (0–1)
|
|15,464
|3-7
|- style="text-align:center; background: #fbb"
|11
|April 14
|@ Tigers
|10 – 5
|Nitkowski (1–2)
|Rupe (0–2)
|
|25,043
|3-8
|- style="text-align:center; background: #bfb"
|12
|April 15
|@ Tigers
|7 – 0
|Gooden (1–0)
|Weaver (0–1)
|
|25,969
|4-8
|- style="text-align:center; background: #bfb"
|13
|April 16
|@ Tigers
|7 – 6
|Hernandez (1–1)
|Jones (0–1)
|
|24,686
|5-8
|- style="text-align:center; background: #fbb"
|14
|April 19
|@ Orioles
|3 – 2
|Trombley (1–1)
|Mecir (2–1)
|
|40,077
|5-9
|- style="text-align:center; background: #fbb"
|15
|April 20
|@ Orioles
|8 – 4
|Rapp (2–0)
|Rupe (0–3)
|
|34,536
|5-10
|- style="text-align:center; background: #fbb"
|16
|April 21
|Angels
|9 – 6
|Petkovsek (1–2)
|Hernandez (1–2)
|Percival (5)
|22,221
|5-11
|- style="text-align:center; background: #bfb"
|17
|April 22
|Angels
|11 – 9 (10)
|Lopez (1–0)
|Mercker (0–1)
|
|22,042
|6-11
|- style="text-align:center; background: #bfb"
|18
|April 23
|Angels
|1 – 0
|Eiland (1–0)
|Dickson (2–1)
|Hernandez (2)
|15,601
|7-11
|- style="text-align:center; background: #fbb"
|19
|April 25
|@ Royals
|7 – 6
|Reichert (1–0)
|Lopez (1–1)
|
|14,677
|7-12
|- style="text-align:center; background: #fbb"
|20
|April 26
|@ Royals
|7 – 6
|Bottalico (3–1)
|Lopez (1–2)
|
|14,209
|7-13
|- style="text-align:center; background: #bfb"
|21
|April 27
|@ Angels
|7 – 3
|Gooden (2–0)
|Ortiz (1–2)
|
|16,144
|8-13
|- style="text-align:center; background: #bfb"
|22
|April 28
|@ Angels
|11 – 2
|Yan (1–1)
|Dickson (2–2)
|
|31,888
|9-13
|- style="text-align:center; background: #fbb"
|23
|April 29
|@ Angels
|7 – 6 (13)
|Levine (1–0)
|Sparks (0–1)
|
|26,827
|9-14
|- style="text-align:center; background: #fbb"
|24
|April 30
|@ Angels
|5 – 2
|Bottenfield (2–3)
|Trachsel (1–2)
|Percival (6)
|25,613
|9-15
|-

|- style="text-align:center; background: #fbb"
|25
|May 2
|Rangers
|8 – 1
|Helling (3–1)
|Rupe (0–4)
|
|15,067
|9-16
|- style="text-align:center; background: #fbb"
|26
|May 3
|Rangers
|5 – 1
|Clark (3–2)
|Gooden (2–1)
|Wetteland (3)
|14,064
|9-17
|- style="text-align:center; background: #bfb"
|27
|May 4
|Rangers
|8 –7 (11)
|Lopez (2–2)
|Zimmerman (0–4)
|
|14,107
|10-17
|- style="text-align:center; background: #fbb"
|28
|May 5
|@ Red Sox
|5 – 3
|Martínez (2–2)
|Eiland (1–1)
|Lowe (6)
|32,479
|10-18
|- style="text-align:center; background: #bfb"
|29
|May 6
|@ Red Sox
|1 – 0
|Trachsel (2–2)
|Martínez (5–1)
|
|32,497
|11-18
|- style="text-align:center; background: #fbb"
|30
|May 7
|@ Red Sox
|9 – 7
|Fassero (4–1)
|Rekar (0–1)
|Lowe (7)
|32,336
|11-19
|- style="text-align:center; background: #fbb"
|31
|May 8
|@ Yankees
|6 – 3
|Pettitte (2–1)
|Gooden (2–2)
|Rivera (12)
|25,361
|11-20
|- style="text-align:center; background: #fbb"
|32
|May 9
|@ Yankees
|4 – 3 (10)
|Nelson (6–0)
|White (0–2)
|
|23,097
|11-21
|- style="text-align:center; background: #bfb"
|33
|May 11
|@ Yankees
|1 – 0
|Trachsel (3–2)
|Hernández (4–2)
|Lopez (1)
|14,292
|12-21
|- style="text-align:center; background: #bfb"
|34
|May 12
|Blue Jays
|4 – 3
|White (1–2)
|Carpenter (3–4)
|Lopez (2)
|17,532
|13-21
|- style="text-align:center; background: #fbb"
|35
|May 13
|Blue Jays
|8 – 4
|Escobar (4–4)
|Lidle (0–1)
|
|20,054
|13-22
|- style="text-align:center; background: #fbb"
|36
|May 14
|Blue Jays
|3 – 2
|Wells (7–1)
|Lopez (2–3)
|
|15,788
|13-23
|- style="text-align:center; background: #fbb"
|37
|May 15
|@ Rangers
|6 – 5
|Oliver (1–2)
|White (1–3)
|Wetteland (6)
|26,683
|13-24
|- style="text-align:center; background: #fbb"
|38
|May 16
|@ Rangers
|9 – 7
|Zimmerman (1–4)
|Lopez (2–4)
|Wetteland (7)
|31,033
|13-25
|- style="text-align:center; background: #fbb"
|39
|May 17
|@ Rangers
|11 – 6
|Crabtree (1–1)
|Rekar (0–2)
|
|27,342
|13-26
|- style="text-align:center; background: #fbb"
|40
|May 19
|@ Mariners
|7 – 6
|Mesa (2–2)
|Taylor (0–1)
|Sasaki (5)
|34,067
|13-27
|- style="text-align:center; background: #bfb"
|41
|May 20
|@ Mariners
|4 – 3
|Yan (2–1)
|Ramsay (0–1)
|Hernandez (3)
|40,665
|14-27
|- style="text-align:center; background: #fbb"
|42
|May 21
|@ Mariners
|8 – 4
|Sele (4–2)
|Trachsel (3–3)
|
|45,264
|14-28
|- style="text-align:center; background: #bfb"
|43
|May 23
|Athletics
|6 – 4
|Rekar (1–2)
|Olivares (3–5)
|Hernandez (4)
|13,555
|15-28
|- style="text-align:center; background: #fbb"
|44
|May 24
|Athletics
|9 – 2
|Appier (4–3)
|Gooden (2–3)
|Tam (1)
|13,039
|15-29
|- style="text-align:center; background: #fbb"
|45
|May 25
|Athletics
|6 – 3
|Heredia (6–3)
|Yan (2–2)
|Isringhausen (9)
|13,251
|15-30
|- style="text-align:center; background: #fbb"
|46
|May 26
|Mariners
|11 – 4
|Sele (5–2)
|Trachsel (3–4)
|
|14,627
|15-31
|- style="text-align:center; background: #fbb"
|47
|May 27
|Mariners
|6 – 3
|Tomko (3–2)
|Rekar (1–3)
|Sasaki (6)
|24,373
|15-32
|- style="text-align:center; background: #bfb"
|48
|May 28
|Mariners
|14 – 4
|Mecir (3–1)
|Mesa (2–4)
|
|16,194
|16-32
|- style="text-align:center; background: #fbb"
|49
|May 29
|Orioles
|5 – 1
|Rapp (4–2)
|Trachsel (3–5)
|
|24,209
|16-33
|- style="text-align:center; background: #fbb"
|50
|May 30
|Orioles
|8 – 7
|Ponson (3–2)
|Yan (2–3)
|Timlin (4)
|13,113
|16-34
|- style="text-align:center; background: #bfb"
|51
|May 31
|Orioles
|4 – 3
|Mecir (4–1)
|Groom (3–3
|Hernandez (5)
|13,870
|17-34
|-

|- style="text-align:center; background: #bfb"
|52
|June 1
|Orioles
|2 – 1
|Rekar (2–3)
|Erickson (2–2)
|Hernandez (6)
|14,108
|18-34
|- style="text-align:center; background: #fbb"
|53
|June 2
|@ Mets
|5 – 3
|Rusch (3–4)
|White (1–4)
|Benítez (14)
|24,123
|18-35
|- style="text-align:center; background: #fbb"
|54
|June 3
|@ Mets
|1 – 0
|Leiter (6–1)
|Trachsel (3–6)
|Benítez (15)
|33,694
|18-36
|- style="text-align:center; background: #bfb"
|55
|June 4
|@ Mets
|15 – 5
|Yan (3–3)
|Jones (1–2)
|
|43,610
|19-36
|- style="text-align:center; background: #bfb"
|56
|June 5
|@ Phillies
|5 – 3 (12)
|Guthrie (3–3)
|Boyd (0–1)
|White (1)
|13,237
|20-36
|- style="text-align:center; background: #bfb"
|57
|June 6
|@ Phillies
|5 – 3 (10)
|Hernandez (2–2)
|Brantley (1–1)
|White (2)
|13,415
|21-36
|- style="text-align:center; background: #fbb"
|58
|June 7
|@ Phillies
|5 – 4
|Brock (1–4)
|Guthrie (3–4)
|Brantley (5)
|20,514
|21-37
|- style="text-align:center; background: #bfb"
|59
|June 9
|Marlins
|6 – 4
|Trachsel (4–6)
|Dempster (6–4)
|Hernandez (7)
|16,035
|22-37
|- style="text-align:center; background: #fbb"
|60
|June 10
|Marlins
|5 – 1
|Cornelius (1–1)
|Yan (3–4)
|Alfonseca (18)
|42,823
|22-38
|- style="text-align:center; background: #bfb"
|61
|June 11
|Marlins
|7 – 6
|Mecir (5–1)
|Bones (1–2)
|Hernandez (8)
|20,647
|23-38
|- style="text-align:center; background: #fbb"
|62
|June 13
|Angels
|5 – 3
|Etherton (1–1)
|Rekar (2–4)
|Percival (16)
|13,483
|23-39
|- style="text-align:center; background: #bfb"
|63
|June 14
|Angels
|3 – 2
|Lopez (3–4)
|Percival (4–3)
|
|13,362
|24-39
|- style="text-align:center; background: #bfb"
|64
|June 15
|Angels
|2 – 1
|Trachsel (5–6)
|Hasegawa (5–2)
|
|13,210
|25-39
|- style="text-align:center; background: #bfb"
|65
|June 16
|Rangers
|9 – 2
|Yan (4–4)
|Oliver (2–4)
|
|16,834
|26-39
|- style="text-align:center; background: #fbb"
|66
|June 17
|Rangers
|5 – 0
|Perisho (2–0)
|Lidle (0–2)
|
|22,813
|26-40
|- style="text-align:center; background: #bfb"
|67
|June 18
|Rangers
|6 – 1
|White (2–4)
|Helling (7–6)
|
|20,197
|27-40
|- style="text-align:center; background: #bfb"
|68
|June 19
|Mariners
|10 – 3
|Lopez (4–4)
|Halama (6–3)
|
|38,331
|28-40
|- style="text-align:center; background: #fbb"
|69
|June 20
|Mariners
|4 – 3
|Abbott (4–2)
|Trachsel (5–7)
|
|29,349
|28-41
|- style="text-align:center; background: #fbb"
|70
|June 21
|Mariners
|8 – 5
|Sele (8–3)
|Yan (4–5)
|Sasaki (12)
|27,555
|28-42
|- style="text-align:center; background: #bfb"
|71
|June 23
|@ Rangers
|7 – 4
|Lidle (1–2)
|Helling (7–7)
|Hernandez (9)
|42,336
|29-42
|- style="text-align:center; background: #bfb"
|72
|June 24
|@ Rangers
|9 – 7
|White (3–4)
|Crabtree (1–5)
|Hernandez (10)
|48,256
|30-42
|- style="text-align:center; background: #fbb"
|73
|June 25
|@ Rangers
|9 – 5
|Rogers (7–5)
|Lopez (4–5)
|Loaiza (1)
|37,107
|30-43
|- style="text-align:center; background: #bfb"
|74
|June 27
|Blue Jays
|11 – 1
|Trachsel (6–7)
|Escobar (6–9)
|
|14,657
|31-43
|- style="text-align:center; background: #fbb"
|75
|June 28
|Blue Jays
|5 – 2
|Wells (13–2)
|Yan (4–6)
|
|15,308
|31-44
|- style="text-align:center; background: #fbb"
|76
|June 29
|Blue Jays
|12 – 3
|Castillo (5–5)
|Lidle (1–3)
|
|21,666
|31-45
|- style="text-align:center; background: #bfb"
|77
|June 30
|Yankees
|6 – 4
|Mecir (6–1)
|Nelson (6–2)
|Hernandez (11)
|30,323
|32-45
|-

|- style="text-align:center; background: #fbb"
|78
|July 1
|Yankees
|6 – 1
|Hernández (7–6)
|Lopez (4–6)
|
|37,990
|32-46
|- style="text-align:center; background: #fbb"
|79
|July 2
|Yankees
|5 – 2
|Clemens (5–6)
|Trachsel (6–8)
|Rivera (18)
|31,118
|32-47
|- style="text-align:center; background: #fbb"
|80
|July 3
|Tigers
|5 – 4 (10)
|Patterson (3–1)
|Hernandez (2–3)
|Jones (24)
|15,709
|32-48
|- style="text-align:center; background: #fbb"
|81
|July 4
|Tigers
|11 – 0
|Mlicki (3–9)
|Lidle (1–4)
|
|18,011
|32-49
|- style="text-align:center; background: #bfb"
|82
|July 5
|Tigers
|4 – 1
|Rekar (3–4)
|Weaver (5–7)
|Hernandez (12)
|14,934
|33-49
|- style="text-align:center; background: #bfb"
|83
|July 7
|@ Marlins
|8 – 3
|Lopez (5–6)
|Dempster (9–5)
|Mecir (1)
|13,067
|34-49
|- style="text-align:center; background: #fbb"
|84
|July 8
|@ Marlins
|6 – 5
|Looper (3–1)
|White (3–5)
|Alfonseca (27)
|21,157
|34-50
|- style="text-align:center; background: #fbb"
|85
|July 9
|@ Marlins
|10 – 9
|Sanchez (5–7)
|Creek (0–1)
|Alfonseca (28)
|11,907
|34-51
|- style="text-align:center; background: #bfb"
|86
|July 13
|Expos
|6 – 4
|Mecir (7–1)
|Lira (2–1)
|Hernandez (13)
|14,924
|35-51
|- style="text-align:center; background: #bfb"
|87
|July 14
|Expos
|8 – 5
|Lopez (6–6)
|Armas (6–6)
|Hernandez (14)
|15,870
|36-51
|- style="text-align:center; background: #fbb"
|88
|July 15
|Expos
|4 – 1
|Hermanson (7–7)
|Trachsel (6–9)
|Kline (12)
|19,366
|36-52
|- style="text-align:center; background: #fbb"
|89
|July 16
|Braves
|6 – 4
|Kamieniecki (2–3)
|Mecir (7–2)
|
|41,066
|36-53
|- style="text-align:center; background: #bfb"
|90
|July 17
|Braves
|8 – 6
|Rupe (1–4)
|Mulholland (9–9)
|Hernandez (15)
|28,538
|37-53
|- style="text-align:center; background: #fbb"
|91
|July 18
|Braves
|8 – 2
|Maddux (12–3)
|Rekar (3–5)
|
|31,354
|37-54
|- style="text-align:center; background: #fbb"
|92
|July 19
|@ Blue Jays
|5 – 2
|Escobar (7–9)
|Lopez (6–7)
|Koch (22)
|18,751
|37-55
|- style="text-align:center; background: #fbb"
|93
|July 20
|@ Blue Jays
|6 – 5
|Quantrill (1–5)
|White (3–6)
|Koch (23)
|18,951
|37-56
|- style="text-align:center; background: #fbb"
|94
|July 21
|@ Yankees
|11 – 1
|Gooden (4–3)
|Yan (4–7)
|
|39,518
|37-57
|- style="text-align:center; background: #bfb"
|95
|July 22
|@ Yankees
|12 – 4
|Rupe (2–4)
|Cone (1–9)
|
|47,375
|38-57
|- style="text-align:center; background: #fbb"
|96
|July 23
|@ Yankees
|5 – 1
|Neagle (10–2)
|Rekar (3–6)
|
|45,528
|38-58
|- style="text-align:center; background: #bfb"
|97
|July 24
|@ Tigers
|4 – 2
|Lopez (7–7)
|Nomo (3–10)
|Hernandez (16)
|28,102
|39-58
|- style="text-align:center; background: #fbb"
|98
|July 25
|@ Tigers
|6 – 4
|Blair (7–2)
|Trachsel (6–10)
|Jones (28)
|26,271
|39-59
|- style="text-align:center; background: #bfb"
|99
|July 26
|@ Tigers
|6 – 2
|Yan (5–7)
|Weaver (5–7)
|Hernandez (17)
|32,884
|40-59
|- style="text-align:center; background: #bfb"
|100
|July 27
|@ Royals
|8 – 5
|Rupe (3–4)
|Durbin (2–5)
|Hernandez (18)
|20,898
|41-59
|- style="text-align:center; background: #bfb"
|101
|July 28
|@ Royals
|10 – 3
|Rekar (4–6)
|Stein (1–3)
|
|17,511
|42-59
|- style="text-align:center; background: #bfb"
|102
|July 29
|@ Royals
|2 – 1
|Lopez (8–7)
|Suzuki (5–6)
|Hernandez (19)
|29,162
|43-59
|- style="text-align:center; background: #bfb"
|103
|July 30
|@ Royals
|7 – 6 (10)
|Sturtze (2–2)
|Spradlin (4–3)
|Hernandez (20)
|16,612
|44-59
|-

|- style="text-align:center; background: #bfb"
|104
|August 1
|Indians
|6 – 5
|Creek (1–1)
|Wickman (2–3)
|
|24,481
|45-59
|- style="text-align:center; background: #fbb"
|105
|August 2
|Indians
|5 – 3
|Karsay (3–5)
|Creek (1–2)
|Wickman (17)
|16,909
|45-60
|- style="text-align:center; background: #fbb"
|106
|August 3
|Indians
|5 – 1
|Bere (8–7)
|Lopez (8–8)
|
|21,703
|45-61
|- style="text-align:center; background: #fbb"
|107
|August 4
|Orioles
|10 – 9 (15)
|Johnson (1–8)
|Yan (5–8)
|
|15,590
|45-62
|- style="text-align:center; background: #bfb"
|108
|August 5
|Orioles
|5 – 4 (10)
|Hernandez (3–3)
|Trombley (4–3)
|
|18,471
|46-62
|- style="text-align:center; background: #bfb"
|109
|August 6
|Orioles
|7 – 4
|Rupe (4–4)
|Mussina (7–11)
|Hernandez (21)
|18,864
|47-62
|- style="text-align:center; background: #fbb"
|110
|August 7
|Twins
|4 – 2
|Redman (10–5)
|Rekar (4–7)
|Eddie Guardado
|
|47-63
|- style="text-align:center; background: #bfb"
|111
|August 8
|Twins
|5 – 0
|Lopez (9–8)
|Radke (8–12)
|
|13,155
|48-63
|- style="text-align:center; background: #bfb"
|112
|August 9
|Twins
|5 – 4 (10)
|Taylor (1–1)
|Hawkins (2–3)
|
|13,916
|49-63
|- style="text-align:center; background: #bfb"
|113
|August 10
|Twins
|10 – 4
|Sturtze (3–2)
|Mays (6–14)
|
|14,935
|50-63
|- style="text-align:center; background: #fbb"
|114
|August 11
|White Sox
|6 – 5
|Buehrle (2–1)
|Wilson (0–1)
|Foulke (20)
|18,370
|50-64
|- style="text-align:center; background: #fbb"
|115
|August 12
|White Sox
|5 – 4 (10)
|Buehrle (3–1)
|Hernandez (3–4)
|Foulke (21)
|27,538
|50-65
|- style="text-align:center; background: #bfb"
|116
|August 13
|White Sox
|5 – 3
|Lopez (10–8)
|Howry (2–3)
|
|19,685
|51-65
|- style="text-align:center; background: #fbb"
|117
|August 14
|@ Red Sox
|7 – 3
|Lowe (3–4)
|Taylor (1–2)
|
|32,174
|51-66
|- style="text-align:center; background: #bfb"
|118
|August 15
|@ Red Sox
|3 – 1
|Sturtze (4–2)
|Fassero (8–6)
|Hernandez (22)
|33,015
|52-66
|- style="text-align:center; background: #fbb"
|119
|August 16
|@ Red Sox
|4 – 3
|Wilson (0–2)
|Wilson (0–2)
|Lowe (27)
|31,467
|52-67
|- style="text-align:center; background: #fbb"
|120
|August 18
|@ White Sox
|5 – 2
|Garland (3–4)
|Rekar (4–8)
|Foulke (22)
|25,160
|52-68
|- style="text-align:center; background: #fbb"
|121
|August 19
|@ White Sox
|7 – 0
|Sirotka (11–10)
|Lopez (10–9)
|
|38,926
|52-69
|- style="text-align:center; background: #bfb"
|122
|August 20
|@ White Sox
|12 – 11
|Yan (6–8)
|Foulke (3–1)
|Hernandez (23)
|27,744
|53-69
|- style="text-align:center; background: #bfb"
|123
|August 21
|@ White Sox
|11 – 4
|Sturtze (5–2)
|Parque (10–5)
|
|31,744
|54-69
|- style="text-align:center; background: #bfb"
|124
|August 22
|@ Twins
|3 – 2
|Rupe (5–4)
|Romero (2–3)
|Hernandez (24)
|7,793
|55-69
|- style="text-align:center; background: #fbb"
|125
|August 23
|@ Twins
|8 – 2
|Redman (12–6)
|Rekar (4–9)
|Hawkins (9)
|7,278
|55-70
|- style="text-align:center; background: #fbb"
|126
|August 25
|@ Orioles
|4 – 3
|Ryan (2–3)
|Taylor (1–3)
|Kohlmeier (6)
|24,503
|55-71
|- style="text-align:center; background: #bfb"
|127
|August 26
|@ Orioles
|4 – 1
|Eiland (2–1)
|Ponson (7–9)
|Hernandez (25)
|40,441
|56-71
|- style="text-align:center; background: #fbb"
|128
|August 26
|@ Orioles
|2 – 0
|Groom (6–3)
|Lidle (1–5)
|Trombley (4)
|38,783
|56-72
|- style="text-align:center; background: #fbb"
|129
|August 27
|@ Orioles
|3 – 2
|Spurgeon (1–0)
|Rupe (5–5)
|Kohlmeier (7)
|36,078
|56-73
|- style="text-align:center; background: #bfb"
|130
|August 28
|Red Sox
|5 – 2
|Rekar (5–9)
|Pichardo (5–3)
|Hernandez (26)
|17,721
|57-73
|- style="text-align:center; background: #fbb"
|131
|August 29
|Red Sox
|8 – 0
|Martínez (15–4)
|Eiland (2–2)
|
|17,450
|57-74
|- style="text-align:center; background: #bfb"
|132
|August 30
|Red Sox
|3 – 1
|Lopez (11–9)
|Fassero (8–8)
|Hernandez (27)
|15,043
|58-74
|- style="text-align:center; background: #bfb"
|133
|August 31
|Royals
|2 – 1
|Fiore (1–0)
|Suppan (7–8)
|Hernandez (28)
|13,608
|59-74
|-

|- style="text-align:center; background: #fbb"
|134
|September 1
|Royals
|9 – 5
|Meadows (10–10)
|Rupe (5–6)
|
|18,460
|59-75
|- style="text-align:center; background: #fbb"
|135
|September 2
|Royals
|7 – 5
|Santiago (7–4)
|Hernandez (3–5)
|Bottalico (15)
|23,129
|59-76
|- style="text-align:center; background: #fbb"
|136
|September 3
|Royals
|8 – 2
|Stein (6–3)
|Eiland (2–3)
|
|16,998
|59-77
|- style="text-align:center; background: #fbb"
|137
|September 4
|@ Indians
|5 – 1
|Burba (13–6)
|Lopez (11–10)
|
|42,628
|59-78
|- style="text-align:center; background: #fbb"
|138
|September 5
|@ Indians
|7 – 4
|Bere (11–9)
|Fiore (1–1)
|Wickman (26)
|42,660
|59-79
|- style="text-align:center; background: #fbb"
|139
|September 6
|@ Indians
|6 – 2
|Finley (12–10)
|Harper (0–1)
|
|42,742
|59-80
|- style="text-align:center; background: #bfb"
|140
|September 7
|@ Indians
|4 – 3
|Rekar (6–9)
|Karsay (4–8)
|Hernandez (29)
|42,709
|60-80
|- style="text-align:center; background: #bfb"
|141
|September 8
|@ Athletics
|4 – 0
|Lidle (2–5)
|Heredia (14–10)
|Creek (1)
|12,085
|61-80
|- style="text-align:center; background: #fbb"
|142
|September 9
|@ Athletics
|10 – 0
|Hudson (16–6)
|Lopez (11–11)
|
|30,841
|61-81
|- style="text-align:center; background: #fbb"
|143
|September 10
|@ Athletics
|11 – 0
|Zito (4–3)
|Wilson (0–3)
|
|20,957
|61-82
|- style="text-align:center; background: #fbb"
|144
|September 11
|@ Athletics
|5 – 1
|Appier (13–11)
|Creek (1–3)
|
|9,109
|61-83
|- style="text-align:center; background: #fbb"
|145
|September 12
|@ Angels
|5 – 2
|Belcher (4–2)
|Rekar (6–10)
|Percival (29)
|15,689
|61-84
|- style="text-align:center; background: #fbb"
|146
|September 13
|@ Angels
|8 – 4
|Ortiz (6–5)
|Lidle (2–6)
|
|16,686
|61-85
|- style="text-align:center; background: #fbb"
|147
|September 15
|Athletics
|17 – 3
|Zito (5–3)
|Lopez (11–12)
|
|14,087
|61-86
|- style="text-align:center; background: #fbb"
|148
|September 16
|Athletics
|5 – 2
|Hudson (17–6)
|Wilson (0–4)
|Isringhausen (28)
|17,154
|61-87
|- style="text-align:center; background: #fbb"
|149
|September 18
|Mariners
|4 – 3
|Paniagua (3–0)
|Hernandez (3–6)
|
|13,129
|61-88
|- style="text-align:center; background: #fbb"
|150
|September 19
|Mariners
|5 – 2
|Halama (12–9)
|Harper (0–2)
|Paniagua (5)
|16,726
|61-89
|- style="text-align:center; background: #fbb"
|151
|September 20
|Mariners
|5 – 4
|Sele (16–10)
|Lopez (11–13)
|Sasaki (34)
|17,192
|61-90
|- style="text-align:center; background: #bfb"
|152
|September 22
|@ Blue Jays
|3 – 2
|Lidle (3–6)
|Frascatore (2–4)
|Hernandez (30)
|18,063
|62-90
|- style="text-align:center; background: #fbb"
|153
|September 23
|@ Blue Jays
|7 – 6
|Koch (9–3)
|Enders (0–1)
|
|24,473
|62-91
|- style="text-align:center; background: #bfb"
|154
|September 24
|@ Blue Jays
|6 – 0
|Harper (1–2)
|Trachsel (8–14)
|
|28,172
|63-91
|- style="text-align:center; background: #bfb"
|155
|September 25
|@ Blue Jays
|5 – 1
|Wilson (1–4)
|Loaiza (10–12)
|Hernandez (31)
|20,715
|64-91
|- style="text-align:center; background: #bfb"
|156
|September 26
|Yankees
|2 – 1
|Hernandez (4–6)
|Nelson (8–4)
|
|19,469
|65-91
|- style="text-align:center; background: #bfb"
|157
|September 27
|Yankees
|11 – 1
|Lidle (4–6)
|Neagle (15–9)
|
|18,863
|66-91
|- style="text-align:center; background: #bfb"
|158
|September 28
|Yankees
|11 – 3
|Rekar (7–10)
|Clemens (13–8)
|
|20,961
|67-91
|- style="text-align:center; background: #bfb"
|159
|September 29
|Red Sox
|8 – 6
|Yan (7–8)
|Carrasco (5–4)
|Hernandez (32)
|18,290
|68-91
|- style="text-align:center; background: #fbb"
|160
|September 30
|Red Sox
|4 – 2
|Cormier (3–3)
|Hernandez (4–7)
|Lowe (42)
|23,477
|68-92
|-

|- style="text-align:center; background: #bfb"
|161
|October 1
|Red Sox
|3 – 2 (10)
|Wheeler (1–1)
|Croushore (2–1)
|
|28,043
|69-92
|-

Farm system

References

2000 Tampa Bay Devil Rays at Baseball Reference
2000 Tampa Bay Devil Rays team page at www.baseball-almanac.com

Tampa Bay Devil Rays seasons
Tampa Bay Devil Rays
Tampa Bay Devil Rays